Robert H. Williams is a Senior Research Scientist at the Princeton Environmental Institute (PEI), Princeton University.

He graduated from Yale University with a BS in physics in 1962, and from University of California, Berkeley with a PhD, in theoretical plasma physics, in 1967.
He taught at University of Michigan, Physics Department, in 1970. 
In 1972, he became Chief Scientist with the Ford Foundation's Energy Policy Project.

Awards
 1988 Leo Szilard Award for Physics in the Public Interest 
 1989 Max Born Medal and Prize
 1991 Sadi Carnot Award
 1993 MacArthur Fellows Program
 2000 Volvo Environment Prize

Works
"A Renewables-Intensive Global Energy Scenario", Renewable energy: sources for fuels and electricity, Editors Thomas B. Johansson, Laurie Burnham, Island Press, 1993,

References

21st-century American physicists
Princeton University faculty
Yale College alumni
UC Berkeley College of Letters and Science alumni
University of Michigan faculty
MacArthur Fellows
Living people
Year of birth missing (living people)